Jan S. Hesthaven is a Danish mathematician, currently Vice President for Academic Affairs  at EPFL (École polytechnique fédérale de Lausanne). He is Professor of Mathematics, holds the Chair of Computational Mathematics and Simulation Science (MCSS), and was appointed Vice President for Academic Affairs at EPFL (starting in 2021). He is particularly known for contributions to the development, analysis and application of high-order accurate computational methods for time-dependent partial differential equations. He has also contributed substantially to the development of reduced order models and the application of neural networks and machine learning techniques to problems in science and engineering.

Career 
Prof. Hesthaven obtained a Master of Science degree in computational physics from the Technical University of Denmark (DTU) in 1991. In 1995, he received a Ph.D.  in Numerical Analysis from the Institute of Mathematical Modelling (DTU) and in 2009 he was awarded the degree of Dr.Techn. from DTU for substantial and lasting contributions that has helped to move his research area forward and penetrated into applications.

After graduation, he was appointed in 1995 as Visiting Assistant Professor at Brown University, then in 1999 as assistant professor and in 2003 he was promoted associate professor of applied mathematics with tenure at Brown University where in July 2005 he was promoted to professor of applied mathematics.

In 2006, he founded the Center for Computation and Visualization (CCV) at Brown University and was its director until 2013.

He served from Aug 2010 to June 2013 as founding deputy director of the Institute of Computational and Experimental Research in Mathematics ICERM, an NSF Mathematical Sciences Research Institute.

In 2013, he joined  EPFL (École polytechnique fédérale de Lausanne) where he was appointed full professor of computational mathematics and simulation science, and shortly later, in February 2014, he founded the new unit of Scientific IT and Application Support (SCITAS)

Since 2016 he serves as Editor in Chief of SIAM Journal of Scientific Computing.

In February 2017, he became dean of the School of Basic Sciences (SB). In September 2020, he was appointed as Vice President for Academic Affairs at EPFL for a term starting in 2021.

Recognition
Brown University gave him their  Philip J. Bray Award for Teaching Excellence in 2004.
He was elected as a SIAM Fellow in 2014. He was named to the 2023 class of Fellows of the American Mathematical Society, "for contributions to computational methods for PDEs, high-order accurate methods, and the reduced order method".

Books

Notes and references

External links 
 
 
 
 

Year of birth missing (living people)
Living people
Danish mathematicians
Danish academic administrators
Technical University of Denmark alumni
Academic staff of the École Polytechnique Fédérale de Lausanne
Fellows of the American Mathematical Society
Fellows of the Society for Industrial and Applied Mathematics